Melanoleuca privernensis is a species of fungus in the Pluteaceae family. It was originally named Kinia privernensis in 2008 and a new genus Kinia was erected to contain it. Two years later, molecular analysis showed that it was closely related to Melanoleuca, and Kinia was reduced to a subgenus of Melanoleuca.

References

External links

Tricholomataceae
Fungi of Europe
Fungi described in 2008